Bienertia is a flowering plant genus that currently is classified in the family Amaranthaceae s.l. (including the family Chenopodiaceae). For long time, the genus was considered to consist only of one species, Bienertia cycloptera, but in 2005 and 2012, two new species have been separated. 

Species of this genus have acquired an unusual, single-cell type of  carbon fixation without Kranz anatomy, also found in some species of the closely related genus Suaeda.

Species
 Bienertia cycloptera
 Bienertia kavirense
 Bienertia sinuspersici

References

Succulent plants
Amaranthaceae
Amaranthaceae genera
Taxa named by Pierre Edmond Boissier
Taxa named by Alexander von Bunge